The Other Side of Make-Believe is the seventh studio album by American rock band Interpol, released on July 15, 2022, through Matador Records. Produced by Mark "Flood" Ellis and mixed by Alan Moulder, the album was recorded between September 2021 and January 2022 at Battery Studios in London. The songs "Toni", "Something Changed", "Fables", and "Gran Hotel" were released as singles in promotion of the album. The album title comes from the opening lyrics of the track "Passenger".

Music and recording
The album was written entirely during the COVID-19 pandemic. It marked the group's first writing sessions not in person, with Paul Banks in Edinburgh, Daniel Kessler in Spain, and Sam Fogarino in Athens, Georgia; they corresponded via email.
In the summer of 2021, the three reunited for continued songwriting and rehearsals in a group of houses in the Catskills, and in the autumn began recording of the album in North London with Alan Moulder and Flood, the former of whom previously mixed the band's fourth and fifth albums, Interpol (2010) and El Pintor (2014). Banks commented on the uplifting sound of the album, contrary to their trademark typically gloomy tone: "A few of the songs in particular have really unabashedly positive sentiments... something that feels good is the aspiration."

The album's lead single, "Toni", was released on April 7, 2022, alongside the album's announcement. A music video accompanied the single, directed by Van Alpert; the end of the video alludes to a forthcoming second part of the video which was unveiled on April 12 by the release of the video to a new song called "Something Changed". This video features two of the same cast as well as singer Paul Banks driving around in an unmarked police car. On May 18, the band unveiled a new single for the forthcoming album named “Fables” with a lyric video. On July 12, Interpol put out their new single "Gran Hotel" with accompanying music video, which was exclusively released on the band's Facebook page. The music video was later released on other platforms on July 15 with the release of the full album.

Critical reception

The Other Side of Make-Believe received generally positive reviews from music critics. At Metacritic, which assigns a normalized rating out of 100 to reviews from professional publications, the album received an average score of 72 based on 21 reviews, indicating "generally favorable reviews".

Track listing

Personnel
Personnel adapted from album liner notes, Tidal, and interviews with the band.

Interpol
Paul Banks – vocals, bass guitar, rhythm guitar, composer, lyricist
Sam Fogarino – drums, composer
Daniel Kessler – lead guitar, piano (tracks 1 and 5), composer

Additional musicians
Flood – guest vocals (track 4)
Richie Kennedy – guest vocals (track 4)
Juliet Seger – guest vocals (tracks 4, 6, and 8)
Jacob Tressider – guest vocals (track 4)

Technical personnel
Greg Calbi – mastering
Steve Fallone – mastering
Ed Farrell – assistant engineer
Flood – producer
Tom Herbert – mix engineer
Richie Kennedy – recording engineer, additional production
Alan Moulder – mixer, additional production
Jacob Tressider – studio assistant

Other personnel
Tim Head – front cover art
Atiba Jefferson – photography
Nicolas Ortega – rear cover art
Undercard (Matt de Jong and Jamie-James Medina) – artwork

Charts

References

2022 albums
Interpol (band) albums
Matador Records albums